Staple Hill railway station was on the Midland Railway line between Bristol and Gloucester on the outskirts of Bristol. The station was on the Bristol and Gloucester Railway line, but opened in 1888, 44 years after the line had been opened through the site. It served the Victorian suburban developments in the area to the south of Mangotsfield.

Staple Hill was served by stopping trains between Bristol and Gloucester and also by trains between Bristol and Bath that used the Mangotsfield and Bath Branch Line. Set in a cutting and with a tunnel at the east end of the station, it had difficult access and was approach by zigzag paths down the cutting embankment. The station buildings were in Gloucestershire, but the platforms extended inside the Bristol city boundary.

No goods facilities were ever provided at Staple Hill, but the station was well-used by commuters to Bristol and north to the factories at Mangotsfield. Services between Bristol and Gloucester were withdrawn on 4 January 1965 and between Bristol and Bath on 7 March 1966, when the station closed. The line through the station was due to close on 3 January 1970, with services between Bristol and Gloucester diverted to the former Great Western Railway route via Filton Junction, but a landslip at Staple Hill a week before closure meant the diversion came into effect early. The route is now part of a cycle path and one of the platforms is still visible.

Services

References

 Mike Oakley, Gloucestershire Railway Stations, 2003, Dovecote Press, Wimborne, pp123–124

Former Midland Railway stations
Disused railway stations in Bristol, Bath and South Gloucestershire
Railway stations in Great Britain opened in 1888
Railway stations in Great Britain closed in 1966
Beeching closures in England